Palazzo Carafa may refer to:

 Palazzo Diomede Carafa, monumental Renaissance palace of Naples, Italy
 Palazzo Carafa della Spina, historic palace located of Naples, Italy

See also 

 Carafa